McCauley Mountain is a summit and ski resort in the Town of Webb, Herkimer County, New York. It is located just outside the hamlet of Old Forge, in the south-western area of the Adirondack Mountains.

Opened in 1958, it was the hometown hill of Olympic skier Hank Kashiwa.

References

 http://www.mccauleyny.com/mountain.html

External links
 McCauley Mountain Ski Area

Mountains of Herkimer County, New York
Mountains of New York (state)
Ski areas and resorts in New York (state)
Tourist attractions in Herkimer County, New York